Heer Ranjha is a tragic romance folktale from the Punjab about the lovers Heer and Ranjha, best known through the classic poem collection of the same name by Waris Shah (1722 – 1798), an 18-century Punjabi-language poet.

Heer Ranjha may also refer to:
 Heer Ranjha (1928 film), a 1928 Indian silent film by Fatma Begum
 Heer Ranjha (1932 film), a 1932 Indian Punjabi-language feature film by A. R. Kardar
 Heer Raanjha, a 1970 Indian Hindi-language film
 Heer Ranjha (1970 film), a 1970 Pakistani Punjabi-language film
 Heer Ranjha (1992 film), a 1992 Indian Hindi-language film
 Heer Ranjha (TV series), a 2013 Pakistani romance drama television series

See also 
Heer (disambiguation)
Ranjha (disambiguation)
Heer Sial (disambiguation)